XIII George Enescu International Piano Competition took place in Bucharest, Romania, from September 15 to 27, 2014. The competition is held every two years and is a member of the Geneva  World Federation of International Music Competitions. There have been 13 editions since the founding of the competition in 1958, and previous winners include Radu Lupu, Elisabeth Leonskaja, and Dmitri Alexeev. Spanish pianist Josu De Solaun Soto was given the First Prize, becoming the first Spanish pianist to be awarded such distinction in the 56 years of the competition's existence. The prize included $20,000, and recital and orchestral engagements.

Jury

 Jean-Claude Pennetier (president)
 Rolf-Dieter Arens
 Dana Borsan
 Philippe Dinkel
 Wolfgang Manz
 Andrey Pisarev
 Alan Weiss

Prizes

First Prize:  Josu de Solaun.
Second Prize:  Ilya Rashkovsky.
Third Prize:  Vassilis Varvaresos.

Competition Results (by Rounds)

First round

 Dmitry Ablogin
 Lilit Artemyan
 Lia Bibileishvili
 Evgeny Brakhman
 Sofya Bugayan
 Paul Coriolan Cartianu
 Vladislav Chepinoga
 Tatiana Chernichka
 Regina Chernychko
 Emily Chiang
 Daniel Dascalu
 Madalina-Claudia Danila
 Balázs Demény
 Cristian-Mihai Dirnea
 Timofey Dolya
 Sebastian Ene
 Cédric Gremaud
 Simeon Goshev
 Sang-Il Han
 Santa Ignace
 Sang-Wook Jung
 Tatiana Kachko
 Yoon-Jee Kim
 Peter Klimo
 Soshi Koyama
 Yu Mi Lee
 Adela Liculescu
 Dinu Alexandru Mihailescu
 Mamikon Nakhapetov
 Bogdan Marian Nicola
 Woogil Park
 Dmytro Pivnenko
 Mihkel Poll
 Ilya Rashkovskiy
 Shizuka Susanna Salvemini
 Aleksandr Shaikin
 Shizhe Shen
 Denys Shramko
 Coral Solomon
 Josu De Solaun Soto
 Nozomu Sugawara
 Jenna Sung
 Ryutaro Suzuki
 Paris Tsenikoglou
 Tomoya Umeda
 Aurelia Visovan
 Asuna Yamanaka
 Yui Yoshioka
 Yelena Zorina
 Kirill Zvegintsov

Second round

 Evgeny Brakhman
 Tatiana Chernichka
 Daniel Dascalu
 Sang-Il Han
 Peter Klimo
 Adela Liculescu
 Woogil Park
 Dmytro Pivnenko
 Ilya Rashkovskiy
 Shizuka Susanna Salvemini
 Josu De Solaun Soto
 Vassilis Varvaresos
 Aurelia Visovan

Third round
(At the Romanian Athenaeum)

 Evgeny Brakhman
 Adela Liculescu
 Woogil Park
 Ilya Rashkovskiy
 Shizuka Susanna Salvemini
 Josu De Solaun Soto
 Vassilis Varvaresos

Fourth round
(At the Romanian Athenaeum, with the George Enescu Philharmonic Orchestra and Justus Frantz, conductor)

 Ilya Rashkovsky - Sergei Rachmaninov: Concerto for piano and orchestra nº3.
 Josu De Solaun Soto - Piotr Ilyich Tchaikovsky: Concerto for piano and orchestra nº1
 Vassilis Varvaresos - Piotr Ilyich Tchaikovsky: Concerto for piano and orchestra nº1

See also

History of the George Enescu International Piano Competition/Previous Winners

References
Concurs 2020
Pianistul spaniol Josu de Solaun a câştigat secţiunea Pian a Concursului Enescu 2014

External links
Concurs 2020

2014 in music
Culture in Bucharest
Events in Bucharest
Piano competitions
September 2014 events in Romania
2014 in Romanian music
2010s in Bucharest